Haji Nizam Uddin Choudhury is an All India United Democratic Front Party politician from Assam. He was elected in Assam Legislative Assembly election in 2016 from Algapur constituency LA8. He was reelected to Assam Legislative Assembly in 2021.

References 

Living people
All India United Democratic Front politicians
People from Hailakandi district
Assam MLAs 2016–2021
1972 births
Assam MLAs 2021–2026